This list is about Djurgårdens IF players with between 25 and 99 league appearances. For a list of all Djurgårdens IF players with a Wikipedia article, see :Category:Djurgårdens IF Fotboll players. For the current Djurgårdens IF first-team squad, see First-team squad.

This is a list of Djurgårdens IF players with between 25 and 99 league appearances. Since playing their first competitive match, more than 400 players have made a league appearance for the club, many of whom have played between 25 and 99 matches.

Players
Matches of current players as of before 2023 season.

References

Players
Djurgardens IF Fotboll
Association football player non-biographical articles